Michal Žák (born July 12, 1978, in Třebíč) is a Czech meteorologist and television presenter. working for Czech Television since 2005. He works with the Czech Hydrometeorological Institute and is a pedagogue at Charles University, having co-authored a book about climate and weather in 2018.

Bibliography
m

References

Living people
1978 births
Czech meteorologists
Czech television personalities
Czech educators
Television meteorologists